TV Derana is a Sri Lankan private entertainment terrestrial television channel broadcasting in Sri Lanka. Launched on 11 October 2005, it is one of the most popular television networks in the country. Its main transmission tower is on the Kikilimana mountain, and coverage is extended nationwide via eight transmission towers.

The channel is available on digital medium through Dialog TV, PEO TV and the newly launched OTT platform GLUUOO. Derana broadcasts contemporary content that upholds Sri Lankan values on its "අපේ දේ රැකගෙන, අලුත් දේ අරගෙන" / “Ape De Rakagena, Aluth De Aragena” (Conserve our own and embrace the new) platforms.

The channel focuses viewers in the two premium socio-economic categorizations SEC A and SEC B. TV Derana is the No. 1 television channel in Sri Lanka, according to late 2021 LMRB search data. The channel has maintained this position since March 2017.

TV Derana won 47 awards at the Sri Lanka Institute of Marketing  Nielsen People's Awards 2020 including the "Television Channel of the Year", "Peoples Youth Choice Television Channel of the Year". TV Derana won these awards at the previous year as well including the biggest award ‘The Local Brand of the year”.

TV Derana also holds the all-time record for having the most programmes by one channel, in the top 10 most rated programmes. According to the recent LMRB research data, TV Derana has eight programmes in the top 10 including the first two programmes in the country.

In October 2014, TV Derana was appointed the first and only Multi Channel Network (MCN) of YouTube in Sri Lanka.

TV Derana became the first channel in Sri Lanka to reach one million subscribers and one billion total views in 2019.

Programming

The channel broadcasts a range of entertainment programmes including dramas, reality shows, kids programmes, music and variety shows. It operates 16 hours a day, between 05:00 and 24:00.

Current shows

Drama

Deweni Inima
Sangeethe
Iskole
Mal Pipena Kaale
Shakti (Sidu 2)
Diyani
Podu
Lokkige Kathawa

Dubbed programmes
Kırgın Çiçekler as Muthu Ahura 
Kulfi Kumar Bajewala as Mini Pahana Obai
Kızım as Ape Chuti Du
Escola de Gênios as Amuthu Iskole
Mako: Island of Secrets as Kinduru Kumara
Tenali Rama as Panditha Rama
The Loud House as Cuckoo House
Hwarang: The Poet Warrior Youth as Hwarang
The Heirs as Urumakkarayo

Music
Maa Nowana Mama
Sindu Kamare
Leya Saha laya
Cassette Eka
Music Video Award

News
Mid Day News Bulletin (12.00.pm)
Ada Derana (6.55p.m.)
Ada Derana (10p.m.)

Reality
Derana City of Dance
Derana Little Star
Derana Miss Sri Lanka
Derana Dream Star
Derana Film Awards
Derana Star City 
Derana 60 plus
Derana Music Video Awards

Talk shows
360°
Wada Pitiya
Aluth Parlimenthuwa
Malbara Derana
Talk With Chatura
Aluth Parlimenthuwa
ReBuild

Variety
Paara Kiyana Tharuka
Ammai Mamai
Seda Mawatha
Travel With Chathura
Thathvika
Belimal With Peshala & Denuwan
Dishum Dishum

Kids programmes
Tring Tring Show
School TV
Kids Movies
Badagini Time
Noddy
Vidya Pavula

Cartoon
Jang Geum's Dream as ChangumiMotu Patlu as Sootin MartinInspector Pretty
Allan Sellam
Ninja Turtles as Raja Kesbawo
Cédric as Danga putha
King Arthur's Disasters as King KoronaThe Smurfs (TV series) as Nil KurumittoWayside as Vinoda PasalaThe Loud House as Kako GedaraMy knight and me knight and me Punchi Knight 
Camp Lakebottom as Amuthu kandawuraJimmy Two-Shoes as Jimmy 1Jamie's got tentacles as Jimmy 2Tiny Toon Adventures (2008-2011)
Makara Rajadaniya
Nidhan Doopatha
Chaplin & Co as No katha More sina
Bob & Margret
Buddhi and Bunty
Boonie Bears as Sangam Walas Mulla
Gormiti as Podi Wiruwo
Ready Jet Go!

Previous telecasted shows

Drama
Sidu
Diyani (Mini Series)
Podu (Mini Series)
Pawela Walakule Evido Amma
Ravana Season 1 (2018-2019) 
Ravana Season 2 (2020) 
Heily
Ranthiliwewa
Kanthoru Moru
Kusumasana Devi
Adaraniya Poornima
Malee
Aththamma (Malee 2)
 Mihi

Dubbed programmes
Every Witch Way as Magic Lamai
Bepannah as Hamuwemu Aye Sansare
Boys Over Flowers (TV series) as Boys Over Flowers'
Chakravartin Ashoka Samrat as Adhiraja Dharmashoka
The Heirs as Sansara Kumari/Urumakkarayo
Meri Durga as Duwana Lamaya
Bandhan as Ali Malliyi Mamai
Beyhadh as Obath Mamath Ayath
Prithvi Vallabh - Itihaas Bhi, Rahasya Bhi as Pruthuvi Maharaja
Wizards vs Aliens as Maya Sakwala
Meri Aashiqui Tum Se Hi as Sadahatama Oba Mage
H2O: Just Add Water as Kiduru Kumariyo
Mako Mermaids as Kinduru Kumara
Wolfblood as Wurka Shapaya
Asa ga Kita as Aasa
Ride as Ride
Koinaka as Best Friends In Love
Valentin Gloobs as Vidhya Paula
The Worst Witch as maaya Paasala

Music

Talk shows
No Politics
Mihiri Mathaka Magul Gedera
Awakashaya
Mata Mathaka Widihata

Variety
Dream Star Chart Show
Mangala Shihina
Baiscope
Patta Pata Pata
Mehemath Samayan
Breakfast to Dinner
Lanka Soy Game Show
Pita Pita Baadhaka
Sinhala Movie
Fengshui
Bahujana Hithaya
Onna Ottui

Bridal programme
Vivaha
Mangala Sihina

Ada Derana
"Ada Derana" is TV Derana's news flagship brand and currently is the no 1 news provider in Sri Lanka.
Ada Derana news websites operated by Derana. Its content is available in English, Sinhala. and Tamil. It is ranked as one of the most popular local news websites by Alexa.Alexa.Top sites in Sri Lanka, Alexa

In late 2007, Ada Derana entered into a partnership with Dialog Telekom, the largest mobile phone operator in Sri Lanka, to send breaking news alerts to all Dialog mobile subscribers as text messages.

Ada Derana 24

Ada Derana 24 is Sri Lanka's first ever 24-hour television news channel and first dedicated news channel.
The channel is available on Satellite and cable Television.
Catering to the thirst for news and information Ada Derana 24 has redefined the news space in Sri Lanka by providing around the clock news to its viewers. Prior to this news was mainly broadcasts on entertainment channels at a stipulated time. Ada Derana 24’s hourly news that provides days most happening and important news changed that dimension.

Ada Derana 24 programme line up includes
Hourly News (broadcast at the top of each hour),
12.00 Mid Day Prime (Sinhala)
6.55 PM Prime Time News (Sinhala),
First At 9 (09.00 PM in English),
World News (09.35 in English),
Late Night Prime (10.00 PM in Sinhala)

Manusath Derana
Manusath Derana was initiated aligning all the values of the umbrella TV Derana, to ensure the Corporate Social Responsibilities are met independently with a clear sustainable vision.
Since the inception, Manusath Derana has grown to greater heights, well beyond just a CSR project, to the heartiest humanitarian service provider of the Sri Lankan people.

Competitions and sponsorship
Derana has hosted the Miss World Miss Sri Lanka pageant since 2007.

Derana has conducted the Derana London Star since May 2008 in London, UK, to find the most talented upcoming singer among the Sri Lankans living in UK. The first edition received around 220 applications, and auditions were broadcast in Sri Lanka by Derana TV. The winners were determined by a panel of judges and public votes via SMS.

TV Derana is the first channel that hosted a reality show for children in Sri Lanka. The first season was named as Derana Star in a Minute and the rest of the seasons as Derana Little Star. Up to date, nine seasons of Little Star were finished and the grand finale of tenth season was held on 27 June 2020.

Derana started a dancing reality competition with the name Derana City of Dance. Five seasons are finished in the show.

The most popular of all reality shows of Derana is Derana Dream Star, and 10 seasons are finished.

Derana Dream StarDerana Dream Star'' is a music reality show produced by Derana TV. It started in 2009 and now it had successfully completed nine seasons.

Season I (2009)
 Udesh Indula (Winner)
 Milinda Sandaruwan (Runner Up)

Season II (2010)
 Upekha Nirmani (Winner)
 Udesh Manoj (Runner Up)

Season III (2011)
 Keshan Shashindra (Winner)
 Shanaka Udeesha (Runner Up)

Season IV (2012)
 Sasindu Wijesiri (Winner)
 Raween Kanishka (Runner Up)

Season V (2014)
 M.G Danushka (Winner)
 Vishmitha Sachintha (Runner Up)

Season VI (2015)
 Janith Iddamalgoda (Winner)
 Yashodha Priyadarshani (Runner Up)

Season VII (2017)
 Suneera Sumanga (Winner)
 Shalin Kaushalya (Runner Up)

Season VIII (2018)
 Thanura Madugeeth Dissanayake (Winner)
 Raveen Tharuka (Runner Up)

Season IX (2020) 

 Falan Andrea (Winner)
 Nuwandhika Senarathne (Runner Up)

Season X (2021)
 Dulanga Sampath (Winner)
 Anjalee Methsara (Runner Up)

See also
 Nuwandhika Senarathne
 Madhava Wijesinghe
 Sachini Nipunsala
 Shehani Kahandawala

References

External links
 Official Website
 Ada Derana

Power House
Sinhala-language television stations
Mass media in Colombo
Television channels and stations established in 2005